Kirby Morrow (1973 – November 18, 2020) was a Canadian actor, comedian and writer. In animation, he was known as the voice of Miroku from InuYasha, its four movies, and Inuyasha: The Final Act, Van Fanel from the Ocean dub of Escaflowne, Cyclops from X-Men: Evolution, Jay from Class of the Titans, Teru Mikami from Death Note, Trowa Barton from Mobile Suit Gundam Wing, Ryo Takatsuki from Project ARMS, Goku from Ocean's dub of Dragon Ball Z (from Episode 160 onwards), Hot Shot from Transformers: Cybertron and his main role as Cole from LEGO Ninjago: Masters of Spinjitzu. On camera, he was known for the recurring role of Captain Dave Kleinman from Stargate Atlantis.

Life and career 
Morrow was born in Jasper, Alberta in 1973, and graduated with a degree in theatre at Mount Royal University in Calgary. He worked in Vancouver, British Columbia, for most of his acting career.

Death 
Morrow died at the age of 47 on November 18, 2020, just eight days after the death of his father, Tom Morrow. His death was announced on Facebook by his brother, Casey Morrow. The cause of his death was related to a long history of alcohol abuse.

On December 4, 2020, Casey Morrow established the Kirby Morrow Memorial Scholarship Fund to help anyone pursuing an education in the performing arts.

He was cremated and his ashes were scattered into the ocean near Stanley Park.

Filmography

Live-action

Anime

Animation

Film

Video games

References

External links 

Kirby Morrow at eccentrix.com

1973 births
2020 deaths
Canadian male comedians
Canadian male video game actors
Canadian male voice actors
Comedians from Vancouver
Male actors from Alberta
Male actors from Vancouver
People from Jasper, Alberta
20th-century Canadian male actors
21st-century Canadian male actors
Alcohol-related deaths in Canada
Comedians from Alberta